The 2013–14 season was APOEL's 74th season in the Cypriot First Division and 86th year in existence as a football club. APOEL completed a historical domestic treble during the 2013–14 season, winning all the titles in Cyprus, the League, the Cup and the Super Cup.

Season review

Head coach and chairman changes during season
On 4 October 2013, a day after the home defeat to Eintracht Frankfurt in the group stage of the UEFA Europa League, the club announced the termination of Paulo Sérgio's contract, due to a disappointing run of results domestically and abroad. Paulo Sérgio was replaced by Greek coach Giorgos Donis, who on 11 October 2013 signed a contract until the end of the 2013–14 season.

Phivos Erotokritou, the chairman of APOEL since November 2008, resigned and on 4 December 2013 he was replaced by Prodromos Petrides, who had served again as chairman of APOEL from 2001 to 2006.

Pre-season and friendlies
The first training session for the season took place on 21 June 2013 at APOEL's training centre. On 6 July 2013, the team flew to Obertraun in Austria to perform the main stage of their pre-season training and returned to Cyprus on 20 July 2013. During the pre-season training stage in Austria, APOEL played six friendly matches against FK Baumit Jablonec (1–2 loss), SC Paderborn 07 (0–2 loss), FC Zbrojovka Brno (1–1 draw), FC Slovácko (2–2 draw), PAOK (0–1 loss) and TSG 1899 Hoffenheim (0–3 loss). After its return to Cyprus, the team played one more friendly match against Doxa Katokopias at GSP Stadium on 23 July 2013, in a match which APOEL won by 2–1.

LTV Super Cup
On 17 August 2013, APOEL beat Apollon Limassol 1–0 at GSP Stadium to lift Cypriot Super Cup. Paulo Sérgio's men picked up their first silverware of the season thanks to a 35th-minute goal from Portuguese defender Mário Sérgio.

Cypriot First Division

Regular season
On 2 September 2013, APOEL opened their competitive season with a 3–0 win at GSP Stadium against Enosis Neon Paralimni. Vinícius opened the scoring in the 58th minute, while Constantinos Charalambides and João Guilherme scored two late goals, both from direct free kicks. On 14 September 2013, APOEL suffered its first league defeat after losing 1–2 at AEL Limassol. Edwin Ouon and Orlando Sá scored two first half goals for AEL and APOEL scored in the 57th minute, when Diego Gaúcho put the ball into his own net after a cross from Esmaël Gonçalves. On 23 September 2013, APOEL drew 1–1 at home against AEK Larnaca. Nestoras Mitidis put the visitors in front in the 39th minute and Efstathios Aloneftis scored the equaliser for APOEL with a stunning solo effort in the 56th minute. On 28 September 2013, APOEL beat Nea Salamina by 1–0 at Ammochostos Stadium, with Mário Sérgio netting the game's only goal in the 45th minute, after trying a weak shot from the right side of the box that tricked Salamina's goalkeeper Srđan Blažić. On 7 October 2013, APOEL won Aris Limassol 1–0 at home under caretaker coach Yiannos Ioannou, with Nuno Morais scoring the only goal of the match in the 13th minute. On 19 October 2013, APOEL lost 0–2 against Ermis Aradippou at Ammochostos Stadium, in Giorgos Donis debut as APOEL coach. Henrique scored the first goal for Ermis in the 81st minute by illegally using his right hand and the same player made it 2–0 from a penalty kick in the injury time. On 28 October 2013, APOEL earned three valuable points after beating Anorthosis 1–0 at GSP Stadium, thanks to a 52nd-minute goal by João Guilherme. On 2 November 2013, APOEL's disappointing run continued as the champions were defeated 0–2 by Apollon Limassol at Tsirion Stadium, thanks to Fotios Papoulis and Marcos Gullón second half goals. After this defeat APOEL dropped to the 6th place, eight points behind leaders Apollon Limassol. On 11 November 2013, APOEL easily beat last-placed Alki Larnaca 3–0 at home behind closed doors, with two goals from Mario Budimir and an own goal from Alki's player Constantinos Laifis. On 23 November 2013, APOEL drew 1–1 with Doxa Katokopias at Makario Stadium. Ricardo Fernandes put Doxa ahead after 41 minutes and Gustavo Manduca equalised for APOEL with a penalty in the 67th minute. On 2 December 2013, APOEL recorded their biggest win (by that time) in the season, beating AEK Kouklia 5–0 at home. Esmaël Gonçalves scored a hat-trick, while Gustavo Manduca and Constantinos Charalambides added a goal apiece in APOEL's victory. On 2 December 2013, APOEL beat Ethnikos Achna 2–0 at Dasaki Stadium, thanks to a goal from the penalty spot by Gustavo Manduca and a late goal from Cillian Sheridan. On 16 December 2013, APOEL beat Omonia 2–0 in Nicosia's derby and climbed up to fourth place. Gustavo Manduca opened the proceedings nine minutes after the interval with his fourth goal of the season, while Nuno Morais set up the final score 15 minutes from time after an individual effort. After this match APOEL were fourth with 26 points, only four points behind the leaders duo AEL and Apollon. On 22 December 2013, APOEL sealed their fourth consecutive league win by beating Enosis Neon Paralimni 3–0 at Tasos Markou Stadium. Efstathios Aloneftis got APOEL on the board just four minutes into the match and Marcelo Oliveira scored another one early in the second half, while Vinícius made it 0–3, in APOEL's final match of the year 2013. On 4 January 2014, APOEL drew 2–2 at home against AEL Limassol and remained four points five points off the top. Monteiro opened the scoring for AEL after only six minutes, but Efstathios Aloneftis and Gustavo Manduca struck twice in the space of three minutes to give APOEL the lead, before Orlando Sá equalise for AEL in the 34th minute. On 11 January 2014, APOEL drew their second league game in a row as they were held 1–1 by AEK Larnaca at GSZ Stadium and dropped to the 4th place, six points behind leaders AEL Limassol. Joan Tomás scored from the rebound after his penalty was saved by Urko Pardo in the 29th minute and two minutes later Constantinos Charalambides equalised for APOEL with a close-range effort, after Mário Sérgio's pass. On 19 January 2014, APOEL beat Nea Salamina 3–1 at home, in a match which was played behind closed doors. Gustavo Manduca opened the scoring with a direct free kick in the 29th minute and six minutes later César Santin scored his first official goal for APOEL to make it 2–0. Selim Benachour scored again for APOEL three minutes after the interval, while Hélio Roque just pulled one goal back for Nea Salamina in the 63rd minute. On 25 January 2014, APOEL came back from one down to beat Aris Limassol 3–1 at Tsirion Stadium. Mihai Dina gave Aris Limassol the lead in the 21st minute, but APOEL turned the match with a goal from Gustavo Manduca in the 43rd minute and an own goal from Maximiliano Oliva one minute later, before Vinícius score a third goal for APOEL in the 73rd minute. On 1 February 2014, APOEL ended Ermis Aradippou's 17-match unbeaten run with 3–0 win at GSP Stadium. Efstathios Aloneftis opened the scoring in the 35th minute and Tomás De Vincenti scored his first two official goals for APOEL in the 55th and 60th minute to make the final score 3–0. On 5 February 2014, APOEL continued their impressive form with a well deserved 2–1 win over Anorthosis at Antonis Papadopoulos Stadium and coupled with the unexpected draw of leaders AEL Limassol closed the gap at the top to four points. Tomás De Vincenti gave APOEL the lead in the 18th minute from the penalty spot and Roberto Colautti managed to equalise for Anorthosis in the 76th minute, but five minutes later Cillian Sheridan scored from close range to give his team an important win. On 9 February 2014, APOEL achieved an important 2–1 victory over Apollon Limassol at home and climbed up to second place. Gastón Sangoy gave Apollon the lead after just 11 minutes, but Tomás De Vincenti struck twice in the second half, first with a penalty in the 67th minute and seven minutes with an amazing shot from an incredibly difficult angle. On 15 February 2014, APOEL achieved an easy 3–1 win over last-placed Alki Larnaca at GSZ Stadium. Nuno Morais put APOEL ahead after 20 minutes, while Kaká and César Santin scored in the second half to make it 3–0, before Demetris Kyprianou score Alki's only goal five minutes before the end. On 22 February 2014, APOEL trashed Doxa Katokopias 5–1 at home and closed the gap at the top to one point only. Efstathios Aloneftis notched a hat-trick and Brazilian forward Gustavo Manduca scored the other two, while Doxa's consolation goal came from a powerful 40-yard shot from Nilson Antonio. On 9 March 2014, APOEL continued their impressive form with a 6–1 thrashing of AEK Kouklia at Pafiako Stadium. Within 25 minutes the game was all but over as a brace from Tomás De Vincenti, a Gustavo Manduca penalty and a red card for AEK Kouklia's Pantelis Pitsillos gave APOEL a 3–0 lead. AEK Kouklia managed to reduce the deficit through Alexandros Garpozis before the break but APOEL proved too strong as Nektarios Alexandrou and substitute César Santin with a couple completed the rout. On 15 March 2014, APOEL extended their winning streak to nine games with a 2–0 win over Ethnikos Achna at GSP Stadium. Gustavo Manduca opened the scoring with a direct free kick in the 17th minute and nine minutes later César Santin scored from close range after Nektarios Alexandrou's cross to make it 2–0 for APOEL. On 19 March 2014, APOEL were held to a goalless draw by Omonia at GSP Stadium and dropped to the third place, three points behind leaders AEL Limassol.

Play-offs
On 23 March 2014, in its first Championship play-off match, APOEL maintained the pressure on AEL Limassol with a slender 2–1 win over Ermis Aradippou at Ammochostos Stadium. Tomás De Vincenti opened the score when he converted a 42nd minute penalty and Efstathios Aloneftis headed in the second two minutes from the end, after an excellent cross by César Santin. An own goal from Kaká in the added time ensured a nervy finish for APOEL, which climbed up to second place, three points off the top. On 29 March 2014, in one of their best performances this season, APOEL thrashed Apollon Limassol 3–0 at GSP Stadium. Gustavo Manduca opened the score midway through the first half, while Cillian Sheridan doubled the score with a superb solo effort before Vinícius finish off a great APOEL move in the last minute. On 5 April 2014, APOEL were held to a goalless draw by Omonia at GSP Stadium and remained three points behind leaders AEL Limassol, which they also drew against Apollon. On 13 April 2014, APOEL got hard-earned 1–0 win over Anorthosis at Antonis Papadopoulos Stadium, breaking the deadlock through Vinícius in the 73rd minute. On 22 April 2014, APOEL thrashed AEL Limassol 3–0 at GSP Stadium and climbed to the top of the league table, level on points with AEL. APOEL got off to a great start when Efstathios Aloneftis crossed the ball and Nuno Morais headed past AEL keeper Karim Fegrouche in the fifth minute. Four minutes before half time Tiago Gomes released Constantinos Charalambides on the right side and his cross was headed past Fegrouche by César Santin. The icing on the cake came late on in the game when APOEL's midfielder Nuno Morais ran clear and set Gustavo Manduca up for an easy third goal. On 26 April 2014, APOEL's 23-match unbeaten run ended by Ermis Aradippou which won 2–1 at GSP Stadium and forced APOEL to their first home defeat of the season. Marco Tagbajumi gave Ermis the lead early in the second half, with APOEL unable to break down a resolute Ermis rearguard until the 80th minute when defender Marios Antoniades equalised from close range, but five minutes from time Dragan Žarković netted the winner. On 3 May 2014, APOEL were beaten 1–2 at Tsirion Stadium by Apollon Limassol and remained to the second place, six points off the top. Despite taking an early lead through Nuno Morais and seemingly in control of the game, APOEL collapsed for a second consecutive game and conceded two goals in each half by Apollon's striker Abraham Gneki Guié. On 7 May 2014, APOEL managed to defeat their bitter rivals Omonia 2–1 at home and closed the gap at the top to three points, taking advantage of AEL Limassol's 0–1 defeat by Apollon. Tomás De Vincenti opened the scoring for APOEL with a direct free kick in the 23rd minute, but fifteen minutes later Alípio equalised with the same way. The winning goal came from Aldo Adorno in the 76th minute, two minutes after he had come on as a substitute. On 11 May 2014, APOEL trashed Anorthosis 8–1 at home and after AEL's win the champion would be decided on the last day. Brazilian defender Kaká opened the score in the fifth minute and when Anorthosis defender Demetris Economou was sent off for tripping Irish forward Cillian Sheridan in the penalty area it was all over. Tomás De Vincenti grabbed a hat-trick, Kaká a brace with João Guilherme, Cillian Sheridan and Mário Sérgio also getting on the scoreboard, while Nuno Morais put the ball into his own net to score Anorthosis' only goal. On 17 May 2014, AEL Limassol hosted APOEL at Tsirion Stadium in the title decider match of the First Division. Unfortunately, the referee suspended the match just six minutes into the second half (when the score was still at 0–0), when firecrackers thrown by AEL fans, hit and injured APOEL's Brazilian defender Kaká, who was put on stretchers and rushed to hospital. After Cyprus Football Association's decision the match was replayed on 31 May 2014, behind closed doors at the neutral Antonis Papadopoulos Stadium. APOEL, who needed to win their league-deciding replay in order to pip AEL's charges on head-to-head record, scored through Cillian Sheridan on the brink of half-time and won their second consecutive league title, in one of the most hotly contested championships in recent years. Simultaneously, APOEL completed a historical domestic treble, winning all the season's titles in Cyprus, the League, the Cup and the Super Cup. However, on 6 June 2014, the Cyprus Football Association's (CFA) disciplinary committee – acting as an appeals board – unanimously cancelled on the CFA council's decision to repeat the May 17 championship final between AEL and APOEL, awarding the match to APOEL with a 0–3 score.

Cypriot Cup

First round
In the first round of the Cypriot Cup, APOEL were drawn to play a single knock-out match against Cypriot B2 Division side Digenis Oroklinis. The match was held on 19 December 2013, and APOEL needed extra time to beat Digenis Oroklinis 4–2 on the artificial turf of the Oroklini Municipal Stadium. Marios Elia opened the scoring in the 15th minute with a penalty kick and Andreas Parpas equalised for Digenis with a direct free kick in the 50th minute. Two minutes later, Cillian Sheridan put APOEL in front but Pantelis Tavrou equaliser in the 74th minute took the match to extra time. During the extra 30 minutes, APOEL were better side and struck twice with a header from Cillian Sheridan in the 104th minute and with a penalty kick from Gustavo Manduca seven minutes before the end.

Second round
APOEL were drawn to face AEL Limassol in a two-leg match-up for the second round of the Cypriot Cup. On 8 January 2014, in the first leg of their Cypriot Cup second round clash, APOEL secured a narrow 1–0 advantage over AEL Limassol at GSP Stadium after Irish striker Cillian Sheridan scored from close range in the 40th minute.

On 22 January 2014, APOEL recorded another 1–0 win over AEL Limassol at Tsirion Stadium for an aggregate 2–0 victory over last season's beaten finalists in the second round of the Cypriot Cup. Gustavo Manduca scored the only goal of the game in the 64th minute, converting Tomás De Vincenti's cross, to secure APOEL's progression into the quarter-finals for the first time since the 2009–10 season, also getting revenge over AEL Limassol who knocked them out at this stage of the competition in the last two seasons.

Quarter-finals
APOEL were drawn to face Alki Larnaca in a two-leg match-up for the quarter-finals of the Cypriot Cup. In the first-leg match which was held on 12 February 2014, Giorgos Donis decided to rest many first-team players and as a result APOEL were held to a goalless draw by Alki at GSZ Stadium.

On 19 February 2014, APOEL easily beat Alki Larnaca 3–0 at GSP Stadium and qualified for the Cypriot Cup semi-finals for the first time in four years. After a goalless first half, APOEL made the breakthrough in the 46th minute with a goal from Constantinos Charalambides. Twenty minutes later, Gustavo Manduca scored another one for APOEL, while Constantinos Charalambides struck again with a beautiful long shot sixteen minutes before the end.

Semi-finals
APOEL were drawn to face Doxa Katokopias in a two-leg match-up for the semi-finals of the Cypriot Cup. On 2 April 2014, in first leg semi-final tie, APOEL all but booked their place in the final with a resounding 4–1 home win over Doxa Katokopias. Nektarios Alexandrou opened the scoring with a close range effort in the 20th minute, but Doxa equalised in the 62nd minute after Diogo Ramos headed the ball past APOEL's keeper. Marcelo Oliveira fired APOEL back into the lead a couple of minutes later and then Constantinos Charalambides bagged a brace to give APOEL a 4–1 win that would be enough to send them into the Cup final.

On 9 April 2014, despite fielding a team based only on reserve players, APOEL easily beat Doxa Katokopias 4–0 at Makario Stadium and reached the Cup final, with Christos Pipinis, a brace from Aldo Adorno and César Santin getting the goals.

Final
On 21 May 2014, APOEL won their 20th Cypriot Cup following a comfortable 2–0 win over Ermis Aradippou at GSP Stadium. The club had not won the trophy since the 2007–08 season but the first half goals from Tomás De Vincenti and Cillian Sheridan ensured that the cup would be going back to APOEL after a six-year absence.

It did not take long for Giorgos Donis’ side to get the breakthrough. After some patient build-up play from APOEL, Tomás De Vincenti was played through and the Argentine showed great composure to give his side the lead after just six minutes. APOEL continued to dominate the game and on 28 minutes they doubled their lead. Tomás De Vincenti was involved again, laying the ball off to Tiago Gomes who shook off pressure from Ermis defence before playing the ball across goal with Cillian Sheridan on hand for an easy finish to give APOEL a significant lead. Ermis put up a good fight but were ultimately outplayed by a team with far more experience in the big matches.

UEFA Champions League

Third qualifying round
The team won the national league the previous season and as such entered the third qualifying round of the 2013–14 UEFA Champions League. APOEL were drawn against Slovenian side Maribor. In the first leg, APOEL drew 1–1 with Maribor at GSP Stadium. APOEL took the lead in the 21st minute with a goal by Nuno Morais. Maribor equalised in the 64th minute, when Marcos Tavares scored for the final score of 1–1. In the second leg, APOEL took the initiative from the first whistle and maintained a 60% ball possession at Ljudski vrt, but they only managed a goalless draw against Maribor and were eliminated on away goals rule after a 1–1 aggregate score.

UEFA Europa League

Play-off round
After being eliminated from the UEFA Champions League, APOEL dropped down into the UEFA Europa League play-off round, and was drawn against Belgian side Zulte Waregem. The first leg was held at the Constant Vanden Stock Stadium in Brussels and ended in a 1–1 draw. In the second leg, APOEL lost 2–1 at GSP Stadium and were eliminated.

Group stage

Despite losing to Zulte Waregem in the play-off round, APOEL reinstated in Europa League, replacing the Turkish side Fenerbahçe who were banned because of the match-fixing case related to the 2010–11 Süper Lig title. APOEL were selected by a random drawing among all the losing teams from the play-off round. APOEL were drawn in Group F, alongside Bordeaux, Eintracht Frankfurt and Maccabi Tel Aviv. APOEL finished in third place with five points out of six matches.

Squad

For recent transfers, see List of Cypriot football transfers summer 2013.
Also, see List of Cypriot football transfers winter 2013–14.

Out on loan

International players

Foreign players

Squad changes

In:

Total expenditure:  €240K

Out:

Total income:  €0
{|

Club

Management

Kit

|
|
|

Other information

Squad stats

Top scorers

Last updated: 31 May 2014
1Included both UEFA Champions League and Europa League competitions.
Source: Match reports in Competitive matches, apoelfc.com.cy

Captains
  Marinos Satsias
  Constantinos Charalambides
  Nektarios Alexandrou
  Nuno Morais

Pre-season friendlies

Mid-season friendlies

Competitions

Overall

Cypriot First Division

Classification

Results summary

Results by round

Play-offs
The first 12 teams are divided into two groups. Points are carried over from the regular season.

Championship group

Matches
Kick-off times are in EET.

Regular season

Play-offs

UEFA Champions League

Qualifying phase

Third qualifying round

UEFA Europa League

Qualifying phase

Play-off round

Group stage

Note: Despite losing to Zulte Waregem in the play-off round, APOEL reinstated in Europa League replacing the Turkish side Fenerbahçe who were banned because of the match-fixing case related to the 2010–11 Süper Lig title. APOEL were selected by a random drawing among all the losing teams from the play-off round.

Standings

Matches

LTV Super Cup

APOEL won the 2013 Cypriot Super Cup (13th title).

Cypriot Cup

First round

Second round

Quarter-finals

Semi-finals

Final

APOEL won the 2013–14 Cypriot Cup (20th title).

Notes

References

2013-14
APOEL F.C. season
2013–14 UEFA Champions League participants seasons
2013–14 UEFA Europa League participants seasons